Isha Rikhi is an Indian actress and model. She made her screen debut with Punjabi film Jatt Boys Putt Jattan De (2013) with Sippy Gill. She was part of Happy Go Lucky with Punjabi actor Amrinder Gill (2014). She then appeared in Mere Yaar Kaminey and What the Jatt in 2014 and 2015 respectively. In 2016, she played the role of a lively young girl in the movie Ardaas starring Gippy Grewal and Ammy Virk. She debuted in the bollywood movie "Nawabzaade"

Filmography

References

External links

Living people
Actresses in Punjabi cinema
Bigg Boss contestants
1993 births